The 2015 Fuzhou Open was a men's and women's beach volleyball tournament played between 21 and 26 April 2015 in Fuzhou, China. The event is part of the 2015 FIVB Beach Volleyball World Tour.

Men's tournament

Qualification

Round 1

|}

Round 2

|}

Main Draw

Pool A 

|}

Pool B 

|}

Pool C 

|}

Pool D 

|}

Pool E 

|}

Pool F 

|}

Pool G 

|}

Pool H 

|}

References

External links
Fuzhou Open at FIVB.org

Fuzhou Open
2015 in beach volleyball
2015 in Japanese sport
International volleyball competitions hosted by Japan
Sport in Fuzhou